Newborough is a village in the south-western corner of the Isle of Anglesey in Wales; it is in the community (and former electoral ward) of Rhosyr, which has a population of 2,169, increasing to 2,226 at the 2011 census. the village itself having a population of 892 with 68% born in Wales.

History
In medieval Gwynedd, Rhosyr was the royal demesne and seat of governance for the commote of Menai. The ruined court buildings of Llys Rhosyr ('Rhosyr Court') lie on the outskirts of the present village. Their precise nature is uncertain, but archaeologists at Gwynedd Archaeological Trust consider them to have been a royal home and have established an exhibition of their findings in the village's Pritchard Jones Institute.

Modern Newborough was founded by citizens of Llanmaes in eastern Anglesey who were evicted by Edward I in 1294 in order to promote his new port of Beaumaris. It was, literally, established as a "new borough" and gained its charter in 1303. In the 16th century, Newborough was the county town of Anglesey. It was home to a thriving marram grass industry, used for producing matting, nets and rope. From 1541 to 1553 the constituency of Newborough returned a member to the English Parliament. John Morgan, a blind musician living around 1740, played the crwth in the village.

Newborough is the home of the Prichard Jones Institute, considered an exceptional example of an early 20th-century public institution. The Institute and the six single-storey cottage homes that accompany it were a gift to the village by Sir John Prichard-Jones, who was born in Newborough. Sir John served an apprenticeship as a draper, eventually rising to become chairman of the Dickins & Jones department store in London, to which he gave his name. The Institute was designed by Roland Lloyd Jones and completed in 1905 at a cost of £20,000. The neo-Tudor style two-storey building, complete with clock tower, is an unusually lofty design for a location often buffeted by strong south-westerly winds. The Institute appeared on the BBC2 programme, Restoration, in 2006.

The Welsh name 'Niwbwrch' (pronounced as: nɪʊbuːrx) is a corrupted form of the English; 'Newborough' with the silent letters 'gh' mistaken for the Welsh letter 'Ch' which is pronounced aloud with the voiceless velar fricative [x], akin to how the Welsh surname 'Goch' mutated into the anglicised spelling 'Gough'. This was the original  pronunciation of "gh" in English before it became silent.

Today
The village and its environs provides walking opportunities for visitors, including at Newborough Warren, one of the largest areas of sand dunes in the British Isles, and Newborough Forest, a  woodland. Much of the area around Newborough is a nature reserve, popular for those interested in geology, botany, birds and other wildlife.

There is a large sandy Blue Flag beach at Llanddwyn, which provides access to Ynys Llanddwyn, a mile-long rocky promontory. The remains of the 16th-century church of Dwynwen, the Welsh patron saint of lovers, is located on the island. The beach is a popular kitesurfing location.

Newborough has a primary school, Ysgol Gynradd Niwbwrch, which in 2017 had 63 pupils, 71% of whom came from Welsh-speaking homes.

Just outside the village is Tacla Taid, the Anglesey Transport and Agriculture Museum, the largest of its kind in Wales.

People from Newborough
Sir John Prichard-Jones, 1st Baronet (1841–1917), businessman, partner in the London department store Dickins & Jones
William Jones (1842–1907), master mariner, industrialist and civic leader, settled in Tasmania, Australia
Grace Wynne Griffith (1888–1963) novelist writing in Welsh, joint prize winner at the National Eisteddfod in 1934.

Movies and television filmed in Newborough
 Coast, BBC television series
 Half Light, 2006 horror film starring Demi Moore
 Clash Of The Titans, 2010 historical fantasy film starring Sam Worthington

Photos of Newborough

References

External links

"Criw Niwbwrch / Official Friends of the village website
"More History of Newborough / Hanes Niwbwrch"
"This walk is near Newborough village (BBC)"
Prichard Jones Institute (BBC)
Llys Rhosyr (BBC)
photos of Newborough and surrounding area on geograph

Rhosyr
Coast of Anglesey
Villages in Anglesey
Populated coastal places in Wales